The following is a list of Malayalam films released in the year 1970.

References

 1970
1970
Lists of 1970 films by country or language
 Mal